Dragan Nešić may refer to:

 Dragan Nešić (volleyball) (born 1970), volleyball coach from Serbia
 Dragan Nešić (artist) (born 1954), Serbian artist